Giuseppe "Bepi" Ros (22 September 1942 – 17 February 2022) was an Italian heavyweight boxer. After winning a bronze medal at the 1964 Olympics he turned professional, and spent most of career fighting in Italy.  He retired in 1976. 

Ros died from COVID-19 on 17 February 2022, at the age of 79.

1964 Olympic results
Below are the results of Giuseppe Ros of Italy who competed as a heavyweight boxer at the 1964 Tokyo Olympics:

 Round of 16: defeated Iosef Nemec (Norway) on points, 4-1
 Quarterfinal: defeated Vasile Marijutan (Romania) by disqualification
 Semifinal: lost to Hans Huber (United Team of Germany) on points, 1-4 (was awarded bronze medal)

Professional boxing record

|-
|align="center" colspan=8|42 Wins (24 knockouts, 17 decisions, 1 DQ), 16 Losses (1 knockout, 15 decisions), 2 Draws 
|-
| align="center" style="border-style: none none solid solid; background: #e3e3e3"|Result
| align="center" style="border-style: none none solid solid; background: #e3e3e3"|Record
| align="center" style="border-style: none none solid solid; background: #e3e3e3"|Opponent
| align="center" style="border-style: none none solid solid; background: #e3e3e3"|Type
| align="center" style="border-style: none none solid solid; background: #e3e3e3"|Round
| align="center" style="border-style: none none solid solid; background: #e3e3e3"|Date
| align="center" style="border-style: none none solid solid; background: #e3e3e3"|Location
| align="center" style="border-style: none none solid solid; background: #e3e3e3"|Notes
|-align=center
|Loss
|
|align=left| Alfio Righetti
|PTS
|8
|17 December 1976
|align=left| Milan, Lombardy
|align=left|
|-
|Loss
|
|align=left| Dante Crane
|PTS
|12
|30 September 1976
|align=left| Reggio Emilia, Emilia-Romagna
|align=left|
|-
|Loss
|
|align=left| Mike Schutte
|PTS
|10
|9 July 1976
|align=left| West Ridge Tennis Stadium, Durban, South Africa
|align=left|
|-
|Loss
|
|align=left| Alfredo Evangelista
|PTS
|8
|2 April 1976
|align=left| Madrid
|align=left|
|-
|Win
|
|align=left| Jose Manuel Urtain
|PTS
|8
|5 December 1975
|align=left| Madrid
|align=left|
|-
|Loss
|
|align=left| Bjorn Rudi
|PTS
|8
|25 September 1975
|align=left| Messehallen, Oslo
|align=left|
|-
|Loss
|
|align=left| Lorenzo Zanon
|PTS
|12
|26 May 1975
|align=left| Milan, Lombardy
|align=left|
|-
|Loss
|
|align=left| Bernd August
|PTS
|8
|18 March 1975
|align=left| Berlin
|align=left|
|-
|Win
|
|align=left| Alfredo Mongol Ortiz
|TKO
|5
|14 December 1974
|align=left| Treviso, Veneto
|align=left|
|-
|Win
|
|align=left| Alfredo Mongol Ortiz
|PTS
|8
|21 September 1974
|align=left| Pordenone, Friuli-Venezia Giulia
|align=left|
|-
|Draw
|
|align=left| Dante Cane
|PTS
|12
|26 July 1974
|align=left| Conegliano, Veneto
|align=left|
|-
|Win
|
|align=left| Charley Polite
|PTS
|10
|19 April 1974
|align=left| Treviso, Veneto
|align=left|
|-
|Win
|
|align=left| Rico Brooks
|KO
|5
|1 March 1974
|align=left| Udine, Friuli-Venezia Giulia
|align=left|
|-
|Draw
|
|align=left| Vasco Faustino
|PTS
|10
|26 December 1973
|align=left| Bologna, Emilia-Romagna
|align=left|
|-
|Loss
|
|align=left| Joe Bugner
|UD
|15
|2 October 1973
|align=left| Royal Albert Hall, Kensington, London
|align=left|
|-
|Win
|
|align=left| Miguel Angel Paez
|PTS
|8
|25 May 1973
|align=left| Reggio Emilia, Emilia-Romagna
|align=left|
|-
|Win
|
|align=left| Alfredo Mongol Ortiz
|PTS
|10
|7 April 1973
|align=left| Udine, Friuli-Venezia Giulia
|align=left|
|-
|Win
|
|align=left| Mario Baruzzi
|TKO
|4
|26 December 1972
|align=left| Rome, Lazio
|align=left|
|-
|Win
|
|align=left| Johnny MacArthur Swindell
|TKO
|6
|30 September 1972
|align=left| Pordenone, Friuli-Venezia Giulia
|align=left|
|-
|Win
|
|align=left| Dante Cane
|PTS
|12
|8 July 1972
|align=left| Conegliano, Veneto
|align=left|
|-
|Win
|
|align=left| Vasco Faustino
|PTS
|10
|29 April 1972
|align=left| Schio, Veneto
|align=left|
|-
|Win
|
|align=left| Armando Zanini
|TKO
|7
|18 March 1972
|align=left| Sirmione, Lombardy
|align=left|
|-
|Loss
|
|align=left| Mac Foster
|KO
|8
|26 December 1971
|align=left| Hallenstadion, Zurich
|align=left|
|-
|Win
|
|align=left| Rene Kinsey
|TKO
|2
|26 November 1971
|align=left| Turin, Piedmont
|align=left|
|-
|Loss
|
|align=left| Dante Cane
|PTS
|12
|2 October 1971
|align=left| Bologna, Emilia-Romagna
|align=left|
|-
|Win
|
|align=left| Wendell Joseph
|PTS
|10
|4 September 1971
|align=left| Conegliano, Veneto
|align=left|
|-
|Win
|
|align=left| Danny Machado
|TKO
|3
|10 July 1971
|align=left| Conegliano, Veneto
|align=left|
|-
|Win
|
|align=left| Mario Baruzzi
|KO
|12
|23 April 1971
|align=left| Bologna, Emilia-Romagna
|align=left|
|-
|Win
|
|align=left| Ollie Wilson
|PTS
|8
|6 March 1971
|align=left| Palazzetto dello Sport, Rome, Lazio
|align=left|
|-
|Win
|
|align=left| Ireno Werleman
|KO
|1
|26 December 1970
|align=left| Treviso, Veneto
|align=left|
|-
|Loss
|
|align=left| Mario Baruzzi
|PTS
|12
|18 November 1970
|align=left| Turin, Piedmont
|align=left|
|-
|Win
|
|align=left| Getulio Bueno
|PTS
|8
|14 October 1970
|align=left| Udine, Friuli-Venezia Giulia
|align=left|
|-
|Win
|
|align=left| Ferenc Kristofcsak
|KO
|4
|31 July 1970
|align=left| Conegliano, Veneto
|align=left|
|-
|Win
|
|align=left| Willie Moore
|PTS
|8
|27 June 1970
|align=left| Treviso, Veneto
|align=left|
|-
|Win
|
|align=left| Dante Cane
|KO
|11
|15 May 1970
|align=left| Bologna, Emilia-Romagna
|align=left|
|-
|Win
|
|align=left| Peter Schulze
|TKO
|8
|21 February 1970
|align=left| Treviso, Veneto
|align=left|
|-
|Win
|
|align=left| Burghard Lembke
|PTS
|6
|2 October 1969
|align=left| Treviso, Veneto
|align=left|
|-
|Loss
|
|align=left| Rocky Campbell
|PTS
|8
|14 September 1968
|align=left| Crispiano, Apulia
|align=left|
|-
|Loss
|
|align=left| Juergen Blin
|PTS
|8
|15 December 1967
|align=left| Sporthalle, Cologne, North Rhine-Westphalia
|align=left|
|-
|Loss
|
|align=left| Carl Gizzi
|PTS
|8
|14 October 1967
|align=left| Treviso, Veneto
|align=left|
|-
|Win
|
|align=left| Ermanno Festorazzi
|KO
|7
|13 August 1967
|align=left| Senigallia, Marche
|align=left|
|-
|Win
|
|align=left| Jose Mariano Moracia Ibanes
|PTS
|8
|28 June 1967
|align=left| Treviso, Veneto
|align=left|
|-
|Loss
|
|align=left| Carl Gizzi
|PTS
|10
|17 April 1967
|align=left| London Hilton on Park Lane Hotel, Mayfair, London
|align=left|
|-
|Win
|
|align=left| Jose Angel Manzur
|KO
|7
|23 December 1966
|align=left| Rome, Lazio
|align=left|
|-
|Win
|
|align=left| Pietro Besi
|TKO
|2
|2 December 1966
|align=left| Palazzetto dello Sport, Rome, Lazio
|align=left|
|-
|Loss
|
|align=left| Billy Gray
|PTS
|8
|10 October 1966
|align=left| Grosvenor House, Mayfair, London
|align=left|
|-
|Win
|
|align=left| Roy Enifer
|KO
|2
|18 September 1966
|align=left| Verona, Veneto
|align=left|
|-
|Win
|
|align=left| Andre Wyns
|KO
|4
|24 July 1966
|align=left| Conegliano, Veneto
|align=left|
|-
|Win
|
|align=left| Franco Badalassi
|PTS
|8
|19 February 1966
|align=left| Treviso, Veneto
|align=left|
|-
|Win
|
|align=left| Jose Angel Manzur
|PTS
|8
|20 January 1966
|align=left| Milan, Lombardy
|align=left|
|-
|Win
|
|align=left| Ron Redrup
|DQ
|7
|3 December 1965
|align=left| Palazzetto dello Sport, Rome, Lazio
|align=left|
|-
|Win
|
|align=left| Valere Mahau
|KO
|3
|5 November 1965
|align=left| Milan, Lombardy
|align=left|
|-
|Win
|
|align=left| Dave Ould
|KO
|3
|15 October 1965
|align=left| Palazzetto dello Sport, Rome, Lazio
|align=left|
|-
|Win
|
|align=left| Roberto Bracco
|TKO
|4
|12 September 1965
|align=left| Mestre, Veneto
|align=left|
|-
|Win
|
|align=left| Manfred Ackers
|KO
|2
|21 August 1965
|align=left| San Dona Di Piave, Veneto
|align=left|
|-
|Win
|
|align=left| Henri Ferjules
|KO
|1
|31 July 1965
|align=left| Venice, Veneto
|align=left|
|-
|Win
|
|align=left| Manfred Ackers
|KO
|5
|29 May 1965
|align=left| Sona, Veneto
|align=left|
|-
|Win
|
|align=left| Giancarlo Bacchini
|PTS
|6
|23 April 1965
|align=left| Palazzetto dello Sport, Rome, Lazio
|align=left|
|-
|Win
|
|align=left| Rene Goubelle
|KO
|1
|3 April 1965
|align=left| Genoa, Liguria
|align=left|
|-
|Win
|
|align=left| Giancarlo Bacchini
|PTS
|6
|6 March 1965
|align=left| Treviso, Veneto
|align=left|
|}

References

External links
 

1942 births
2022 deaths
Heavyweight boxers
Boxers at the 1964 Summer Olympics
Olympic boxers of Italy
Olympic bronze medalists for Italy
Sportspeople from the Province of Treviso
Olympic medalists in boxing
Italian male boxers
Medalists at the 1964 Summer Olympics
Deaths from the COVID-19 pandemic in Veneto